The John Macphail Scholarship is an annual rugby union scholarship award in Scotland. It was first given to talented young players; and was later the scholarship also extended to coaches seeking development. The scholarship is named after the former Scotland international rugby union player John Macphail, who died in 2004. The scholarship is a 5 month immersive rugby union programme abroad. Previously award winners have went to New Zealand, recent award winners now go to South Africa for the programme.

Due to the coronavirus pandemic, the scholarship was not awarded in 2020 or 2021.

John Macphail

John Macphail was a Scottish rugby union player who played for Edinburgh Academicals, Edinburgh District and the Scotland international side. He was capped twice in the period 1949 to 1951.

He became Chairman of the Edrington Group in Drumchapel, Glasgow; and was awarded a CBE. The Edrington Group is a private company, known for its whiskies like The Famous Grouse, Cutty Sark and The Macallan, and is owned by the Robertson Trust.

The scholarship was awarded in his memory.

The Robertson Trust

The Robertson Trust was established in 1961 when 3 Robertson sisters - owners of the then family run Edrington Group - donated their shares for charitable causes. The trust today is a charity in Scotland that gives grants to alleviate poverty and trauma. In addition, the Robertson Trust also provide monies for young people to help them progress in their career, and to mitigate financial barriers.

The trust, together with the Scottish Rugby Union, in this award thus provides financial backing for these players and coaches to develop in their rugby union career.

In 2023, Jim Robertson, CEO of the Robertson Trust stated:
The John Macphail Scholarship has proved to be instrumental in the development of some of the brightest player and coach prospects in Scotland and The Robertson Trust is incredibly proud to have been part of that journey.

List of awardees

References

Rugby union trophies and awards
Scottish sports trophies and awards
Awards established in 2005
2005 establishments in Scotland
Sportsmanship trophies and awards